The Montreal Internet Exchange (QIX) was incorporated in 2013 as a not-for-profit Internet Exchange Point (IXP) and is located in Montreal (Quebec), Canada. It was originally created in 1995 by the Réseau d'informations scientifiques du Québec (RISQ) and operated by RISQ until 2013, when it was spun off as the QIX. RISQ still operated the IXP until June 2019. Since then, the exchange is operated by a local private network operator called Metro Optic Inc.

Since 2013, QIX had two core switches, one located at the biggest carrier hotel in Montreal, Cologix MTL3, located at 1250 René-Lévesque West and one at Cologix MTL1, located at 625 René-Lévesque West.

Since the architecture/hardware refresh in 2020, the Cologix MTL3 site host two spine switches and two leaf switches. The Cologix MTL1 site is hosting one leaf switch.

The exchange announced in June 2020 that the IX has expanded to a new location close to the two current sites, eStruxture MTL-1, located at 800 Square-Victoria. This new site is hosting two leaf switches connected to Cologix MTL3 via two diverse dark fibre paths.

Another expansion site has been announced end of August 2020, at Vantage Data Center Montreal II (previously Hypertec YUL01B) and is in production since March 2021. This facility is located at 2800 Trans-Canada Highway in Pointe-Claire, QC in the Greater Montreal. This new site also host two leaf switches connected Cologix MTL3 via two diverse dark fibre paths.

, QIX has 100 unique autonomous systems representing 272 peer connections and peak traffic rates of over 233 Gbps, making it the second largest IXP in Canada.

See also 
 List of Internet exchange points

Notes

External links
 Montreal Internet Exchange website.
 QIX on PeeringDB.

Internet exchange points in Canada
Communications in Quebec
Organizations based in Montreal